Deli Ji-ye Emamqoli (also Romanized as Delī Jī-e Emāmqolī; also known as Delī Jī-ye ‘Olyā) is a village in Poshteh-ye Zilayi Rural District, Sarfaryab District, Charam County, Kohgiluyeh and Boyer-Ahmad Province, Iran. At the 2006 census, its population was 23, in 5 families.

References 

Populated places in Charam County